Kalapani or Kala Pani, meaning "Black Water" in Indo-Aryan languages, may refer to:

Places
 Kalapani River, one of the headwaters of the Kali River on the border between India and Nepal
 Kalapani territory, a disputed territory between India and Nepal under Indian administration
 Kalapani, Bhopal, a village in Madhya Pradesh, India
 Kala Pani, also known as Cellular Jail, a colonial-era prison in India
 Kala Pani, Pakistan, a village in Abbottabad, Pakistan

Film
 Kala Pani (1958 film), a 1958 Indian film (Hindi) about the Kala Pani prison
 Kaalapani, a 1996 Indian film (Malayalam) about the Kala Pani prison

Other uses
 Kala pani (taboo), a taboo of the sea in Indian culture
 Kalapani (Indian expatriates in UK), Indian expatriates who went to UK during the 17th, 18th and 19th centuries

See also
 Blackwater (disambiguation)